Växjö Municipality (Växjö kommun) is a municipality in Kronoberg County in southern Sweden, where Växjö is the seat.

The municipality was created in 1971 by the amalgamation of the City of Växjö with the surrounding municipalities. The number of original local government entities (as of 1863) included in the present municipality is 29.

Localities
There are 12 urban areas (also called a Tätort or locality) in the City of Växjö.

In the table the localities are listed according to the size of the population as of December 31, 2006. The municipal seat is in bold characters.

Economy
Largest employers in the municipality:

Växjö Municipality 7,400
Kronoberg County Administrative Board	4,000
Linnaeus University 1,000
Volvo Construction Equipment 	800
SAAB/Combitech 	340
Atea 	300
Alstom Power 	300
Visma SPCS 	300
Rottne Industri AB 250
Södra Skogsägarna  	230
Getinge Disinfection	230
Boss Media 210
Staples Sweden (TG Skrivab) 210
Coop Dagligvaruhandel 210
Skanska 	200
Wexiodisk 	185

()

Environmental work 

Växjö Municipality has a long-term and strategic environmental and climate work and has called itself “The Greenest City in Europe” since 2007. It has its foundation in a long history of commitment to environmental issues, and ambitious goals for a green future. It is a vision shared with the citizens and the local companies.

In 2017 Växjö, was awarded the European Green Leaf Award 2018 by the European Commission. The prize is awarded to cities with less than 100 000 inhabitants that show good results and ambitions in terms of environment and committed to generate green growth.

Actions and results 

In the early 1970s, Lake Trummen was restored with good results. Twenty years later, the same was done with Växjösjön and Södra Bergundasjön. This was done since the lakes suffered from eutrophication. Through dredging, the damaged ecosystems were restored and today the lakes are fully bath-friendly with a rich wildlife. The aim to receive good water quality for the whole lake system continues and in 2014 the Municipal Council decided to take new actions. 
 
In the 1980s, Växjö Energi AB, Veab, began small-scale use of biofuels in district heating. Thus, the heating plant became the first in Sweden to be fueled with biofuels in this way. In the coming decades, the project was expanded and in 2015, after the inauguration of a third co generation power plant, the heat and power production comes almost entirely from renewable sources.

In 1996, Växjö Municipality decided that it would be completely free from fossil fuels, to be achieved by year 2030. Between 1993 and 2015, carbon dioxide emissions in Växjö have decreased by 54%. This while the city has been able to show strong economic growth. In recent years, Växjö has invested a lot in high-rise wood buildings. Today Växjö is one of the cities where you find most ongoing projects of high-rise wood buildings in Sweden.

International relations

Twin towns — Sister cities
The municipality is twinned with:

  Almere, Netherlands
  Duluth, Minnesota, United States
  Kaunas, Lithuania
  Lancaster, United Kingdom
  Lohja, Finland
  Pobiedziska, Poland
  Ringerike, Norway
  Schwerin, Germany
  Skagaströnd, Iceland

See also
List of Kronoberg Governors
Kronoberg Castle

References

External links

Växjö Municipality - Official site
Tourism Växjö

Växjö
Municipalities of Kronoberg County